Salling is a peninsula located in the north-west of the larger Jutland peninsula in Denmark. The largest city in Salling is Skive, and smaller towns and villages includes Jebjerg, Roslev and Glyngøre.

The Sallingsund Bridge connects the peninsula to the island of Mors, crossing the narrow strait of Sallingsund, part of the Limfjord. The island of Fur lies to the north of the peninsula and is linked by a 3-4 minute ferry service across the Fursund from Branden.

Since January 2007, Salling has been part of the newly formed Skive municipality.

Gallery

References

External links 

Peninsulas of Denmark
Skive Municipality